Feng Xiao-Min (born in 1959) is a Chinese-born French artist.

Biography 
Born in 1959, in Shanghai, China, Feng grew up in a family of intellectuals (banking family from his mother’s side).

After graduating from Fine Arts studies in China, he moved to France in 1988 and enrolled at the Ecole Nationale Supérieure des Beaux-Arts in Paris. Feng was later invited to teach at the same institution from 1997 to 2000. After that, he decided to give up teaching to focus entirely on his own creations.

Feng has published numerous books on paintings and calligraphy. And some of his paintings had been chosen to be integrated into French school manuals.

He regularly exhibits his artworks in France and abroad. In 2003-2004, he participated in a joint exhibition with the French photographer Marc Riboud at the Musée Carnavalet in Paris. He also exhibited in the Jing'an Sculpture Park Art Center, in Shanghai, and in Hong-Kong, alongside of works from French-Chinese artists such as Zao Wou-Ki and Chu Teh-Chun.

His artworks are collected and presented in various private and public collections, including galleries, museums and foundations, in France and abroad. Feng frequently exhibits at international art fairs and biennales and was commissioned to produce work for the 2017 BRICS summit.

Public Collection 
 Art museum Zhu Qizhan in Shanghai, China
 Museum of Modern Art of Duolun in Shanghai, China
 The AMOS Association, The Cultural Center of Saint Saturnin, France
 Cultural Office for the International Exchange of the city of Shanghai, China
 Artco France, Paris, France
 Purple Roof Gallery, Shanghai, China
 HongKong Shui On Group, HongKong
 Museum of Contemporary Art of Anting in Shanghai, China
 Museum of Contemporary Art of Dunkerque, France
 Shanghai Xintiandi Langham Hotel, Shanghai, China
 Image of China Gallery, Singapore
 M.Y. Foundation (Seoul), South Korea
 Pacific International Lines (Pte) Ltd., Singapore
 State commission for the 2017 BRICS summit in Xiamen, China
 Hkri Taikoo Hui Group, Hong-Kong
 The Sukhothai Hotel, Shanghai, China
 Shanghai ART Museum, Shanghai, China

Bibliography 
Feng is the author of several books, published in France, such as:

 Lao Tseu – La voie du Tao– Alternatives Editions, Paris, 2000
 Porte-Bonheur– Alternatives Editions, Paris, January 2002
 Monograph – L’Union de l’Encre et du Pinceau– Flammarion Editions, Paris, May 2003

References

External links 
Official website
Opera Gallery - Feng Xiao-Min

1959 births
Living people
Artists from Shanghai
French male artists
Chinese emigrants to France
20th-century French artists
21st-century French artists
French painters
Chinese painters
Chinese contemporary artists
French contemporary artists